Camelliol C synthase (CAMS1, LUP3 (gene)) is an enzyme with systematic name (3S)-2,3-epoxy-2,3-dihydrosqualene mutase (cyclizing, camelliol-C-forming). This enzyme catalyses the following chemical reaction

 (3S)-2,3-epoxy-2,3-dihydrosqualene  camelliol C

The product is mainly camelliol.

References

External links 
 

EC 5.4.99